The Faculty of Geodesy and Land Management is one of the sixteen faculties of University of Warmia and Mazury in Olsztyn and prepares students to work in the following fields:  digital photogrammetry and Internet photogrammetry, close range photogrammetry, engineering geodesy, satellite geodesy, higher geodesy, geomatics and spatial information systems, land management, numerical cartography, cadastral survey and common appraisal, mathematics and mathematical statistics, spatial and archeological reconstruction, positioning and navigation systems, remote sensing and photointerpretation, theory of deterministic chaos in dynamic analyses, theory of environment and real estate evaluation.  
Students of land management are prepared to work in local governments in the fields of real estate management and turnover, spatial planning, property counselling and expertise. Research on application of global satellite navigation systems, improving methods of acquiring, gathering and processing geodetic and satellite data and their use in special information systems  as well as optimizing methods of space management are only a few examples of scientific fields of interest of the faculty employees.

History
The idea of creating a Geodetic Department is owed to the representatives of the Olsztyn geodetic institutions. Their initiative met with the support of the authorities of the University of Agriculture and the recognition and assistance of the regional authorities. This resulted in the creation of the Professional Study of Geodesy of Agricultural Equipment on October 1, 1960. The first recruitment of candidates for geodesy and agricultural engineering was held in 1960. Next, it was decided to acquire the necessary scientific and didactic staff for the Study. Thanks to the help of the Faculty of Geodesy and Cartography of Warsaw University of Technology the first researchers began their work. On December 3, 1967, the Department of Geodesy of Agricultural Equipment (WGUR) was renamed to the Department of Geodesy and Agricultural Equipment. On November 26, 1971, the Faculty obtained the first doctoral degree in scientific sciences and a PhD in agricultural sciences.

October 1, 1972, with the transformation of the University of Agriculture in Olsztyn in the Agricultural and Technical Academy in Olsztyn, the Space Flight Planetarium was opened. On 11 September 1978, the Satellite Observatory in Lamkówko, near Barczewo and the Astronomical Observatory in Olsztyn were opened. On July 1, 1989, the Faculty was granted the title of doctoral degree in geodesy and cartography. On September 1, 1992, the last name of the Faculty was changed to the Department of Geodesy and Spatial Management. On October 1, 1997, the spatial planning program was launched, and a year later the IT department, which was moved to the newly established Faculty of Mathematics and Computer Science in 2001. On September 1, 1999, after the merger of three higher education institutions into the University of Warmia and Mazury, the Faculty was incorporated into its structure.

On 1 January 2015 the name of the unit was changed to the Department of Geodesy, Spatial Engineering and Construction, and the Faculty took over from the Faculty of Technical Sciences education in the fields of construction.

Research studies
 Practical applications of GNSS - positioning and navigation
 Geoinformatics
 Engineering Geodesy
 Geodetic Calculations Methods
 Geographic Information Systems
 Cartography – mathematical and thematic
 Geodynamics
 Astronomy
 Remote sensing – methods and applications
 Real Estate – valuation and management 
 Cadastral systems
 Land Development

Structure
The research works are conducted within 8 organizational units of the Faculty of Geodesy and Land Management: 
 Institute of Geodesy (IG)
 Chair of Astronomy and Geodynamics (KAiG)
 Chair of Land Surveying and Geomatics (KGS)
 Chair of Real Estate Management and Regional Development (KGNiRR)
 Chair of Cadastre and Spatial Management (KKiZP)
 Chair of Satellite Geodesy and Navigation (KGSiN)
 Chair of Photogrammetry and Remote Sensing (KFiT)
 Chair of Planning and Spatial Engineering (KPiIP)

References

University of Warmia and Mazury in Olsztyn
Geodesy organizations